JX is a microkernel operating system with both the kernel and applications implemented using the Java programming language.

Overview
JX is implemented as an extended Java virtual machine (the JX Core), adding support to the Java system for necessary features such as protection domains and hardware access, along with a number of components written in Java that provide kernel facilities to applications running on the computer. Because Java is a type-safe language, JX is able to provide isolation between running applications without needing to use hardware memory protection. This technique, known as language-based protection means that system calls and inter-process communication in JX does not cause an address space switch, an operation which is slow on most computers. JX runs on standard PCs, with support for a limited range of common hardware elements. It is free software, developed by the University of Erlangen.

The primary benefits of JX include:
 base on a small trusted computing base (TCB) security system
 lack of address space switching compare to most other microkernel systems
 it is a highly flexible operating system with different configuration possibilities

See also

JavaOS

References

External links
Project home page
The JX Operating System
The Structure of a Type-Safe Operating System
A Java Operating System as the Foundation of a Secure Network Operating System

Operating system kernels
Microkernels
Free software operating systems
Microkernel-based operating systems
Discontinued Java virtual machines